Mador may refer to:

 Sir Mador de la Porte, a Knight of the Round Table
Mador (Camp Ramah), training camp for Jewish summer camps in US, Canada and Israel
Terminalia ferdinandiana, commonly known as mador